Mohammad Abu Loum (born 28 October 1973) is a Jordanian football referee who has been a full international referee for FIFA.

Abu Loum became a FIFA referee in 2005. He has served as a referee in competitions including the 2014 FIFA World Cup qualifiers, beginning with the opening-round match between Bangladesh and Pakistan.

References 

1973 births
Living people
Jordanian football referees